Chris McCormack may refer to:

Chris McCormack (triathlete) (born 1973), Australian triathlete
Chris McCormack (guitarist) (born 1973), with 3 Colours Red